Lee Kai-lin (born 15 July 1992) is a Taiwanese Paralympic judoka who competes at international judo competitions. She is a Paralympic silver medalist, three-time Asian Para Games medalist and a IBSA World Games champion. Lee was the first Taiwanese female judoka to win a medal at the Paralympics.

References

1992 births
Living people
Taiwanese female judoka
Paralympic judoka of Chinese Taipei
Judoka at the 2012 Summer Paralympics
Judoka at the 2016 Summer Paralympics
Judoka at the 2020 Summer Paralympics
Medalists at the 2012 Summer Paralympics